The flag of Mississippi, also known as the Mississippi flag, consists of a white magnolia blossom surrounded by 21 stars and the words 'In God We Trust' written below, all put over a blue Canadian pale with two vertical gold borders on a red field. The topmost star is composed of a pattern of five diamonds, an Indigenous symbol; the other 20 stars are white, as Mississippi was the 20th state to join the Union. The flag was adopted on January 11, 2021.

Mississippi has had three official state flags in its history. The Magnolia Flag was declared to be "null and void" by a state constitutional convention in 1865 and the state was left without an official flag until the second one was adopted in 1894.

The second flag, designed by Edward N. Scudder and adopted in 1894, consisted of a triband of three equal horizontal stripes of blue, white, and red, with a canton of the Confederate battle flag. The thirteen stars on the state flag officially represented "the number of the original states of the Union", although they are sometimes thought to be for the states that seceded from the Union plus Missouri and Kentucky, which had both Confederate and Union governing bodies. From 1894 to 1956, and again from 2003 to 2020, this was the only state flag to incorporate the Confederate battle flag into its design, Georgia being the other from 1956 to 2003. In response to the George Floyd protests in 2020, state legislators proposed new flag designs omitting the Confederate flag.

On June 27, 2020, Governor Tate Reeves stated that if the Mississippi Legislature passed a bill that weekend addressing the flag issue, he would sign it into law. Subsequently, on June 28, 2020, the Legislature passed a bill to repeal the sections of the Mississippi State Code which made provisions for a state flag, mandate the Mississippi Department of Archives and History develop a plan for the removal of the former flag from public buildings within 15 days of the bill's effective date, and establish a commission to design a replacement that would exclude the Confederate battle flag and include the U.S. national motto "In God We Trust". Reeves then signed it into law on  June 30, 2020.

The third flag was designed by Rocky Vaughan, Sue Anna Joe, Kara Giles, Daniel Pugh, and Micah Whitson. It was chosen by the Commission to Redesign the Mississippi State Flag, which was established by the same June 2020 Mississippi House bill which retired the second flag. The commission received thousands of submissions, and narrowed them down to a single choice, which was submitted for public vote as a ballot measure on November 3, 2020. Voters approved the new design in a two-choice vote but the removal of the Confederate battle flag from the new proposed design was never approved by voters directly. It is one of three U.S. state flags to feature the words "In God We Trust" (the U.S. national motto), with the other two being those of Florida and Georgia.

History

First flag (1861–1865)
Before 1861, Mississippi lacked a flag. When the State Convention at the Capitol in Jackson declared its secession from the United States ("the Union") on January 9, 1861, near the start of the American Civil War, spectators in the balcony handed a Bonnie Blue flag down to the state convention delegates on the convention floor, and one was raised over the state capitol building in Jackson as a sign of independence. Later that night, residents of Jackson paraded through the streets under the banner. Harry McCarthy, an Irish singer and playwright who observed the street parade, was inspired to write the patriotic song "The Bonnie Blue Flag."

The first flag was known as the "Magnolia flag." It was the official state flag from March 30, 1861, until August 22, 1865. On January 26, 1861, the delegates to the state convention approved the report of a special committee that had been appointed to design a coat of arms and "a suitable flag." The flag recommended by the committee was "A Flag of white ground, a magnolia tree in the center, a blue field in the upper left hand corner with a white star in the center, the Flag to be finished with a red border and a red fringe at the extremity of the Flag." Due to time constraints and the pressure to raise "means for the defense of the state," the delegates neglected to adopt the flag officially in January but did so when they reassembled in March 1861. The Magnolia Flag was not widely used during the war, as the various Confederate flags were displayed more frequently. Following the war's end, a state constitutional convention nullified many of the ordinances and resolutions passed by the State Convention of 1861. Among those nullified was the ordinance of March 1861 "to provide a Coat of Arms and Flag for the State of Mississippi."

Second flag (1894–2020)
On February 7, 1894, the Legislature replaced the Civil War era Magnolia Flag with a new one designed by Edward N. Scudder that incorporated the Confederate battle flag in its canton. This second state flag consisted of three equal horizontal triband of blue, white, and red, with the canton of the battle flag of the Army of Northern Virginia. The 13 stars on the state flag officially represented "the number of the original states of the Union"; though they are sometimes thought to have been for states that seceded from the Union, plus Missouri and Kentucky which had Union and Confederate governments.

The Mississippi Code of 1972, in Title 3, Chapter 3, described the flag as follows:

In 1906, Mississippi adopted a revised legal code that repealed all general laws that were not reenacted by the legislature or brought forward in the new code. The legislature inadvertently omitted mention of the 1894 flag, leaving the state with no official state flag from 1906 to 2001. In 2000, the Supreme Court of Mississippi confirmed that the state legislature had in 1906 repealed the 1894 adoption of the state flag; the flag used since then and considered official had actually only been customary or traditional.

Early proposals to change the 1894 flag

2001 referendum

In January 2001, then-Governor Ronnie Musgrove appointed an independent commission which developed a new proposed flag design. On April 17, 2001, a legally binding state referendum to change the flag was put before Mississippi voters by the legislature on recommendation of this commission.

The referendum, which asked voters if the new design prepared by the independent commission should be adopted, was defeated in a vote of 64% (488,630 votes) to 36% (267,812), and the 1894 state flag was retained. The proposed flag would have replaced the Confederate rebel battle flag with a blue square canton with 20 white stars in a circular row. The outer ring of 13 stars would represent the original Thirteen Colonies, the middle ring of six stars would represent the six nations that have had sovereignty over Mississippi Territory (various Native American nations as a collective nation, French Empire, Spanish Empire, Great Britain, the United States, and the Confederacy) as well as the six states that precede Mississippi's admission (Vermont, Kentucky, Tennessee, Ohio, Louisiana, and Indiana), and the inner and slightly larger star would represent Mississippi itself. The 20 stars would also represent Mississippi's status as the 20th U.S. state and member of the United States of America.

When Georgia adopted a new state flag in 2003, the Mississippi flag remained the only U.S. state flag to include the Confederate battle flag's saltire. In 2001 a survey conducted by the North American Vexillological Association (NAVA) placed Mississippi's flag 22nd in design quality of the 72 Canadian provincial, U.S. state, and U.S. territorial flags ranked.

2015 replacement efforts 
In the wake of the 2015 Charleston, South Carolina, church shooting, in which nine black parishioners of the Emanuel African Methodist Episcopal Church were killed by Confederacy admirer and white supremacist Dylann Roof, there were renewed calls for Southern states to cease using the Confederate battle flag in official capacities. This extended to increased criticism of Mississippi's state flag. All eight public universities in Mississippi, along with "several cities and counties", including Biloxi, later refused to fly the state flag until the emblem was removed. The flag was excluded from state-flag displays in New Jersey, Oregon, and Philadelphia that included the flags of the other 49 states.

Over 20 flag-related bills, some calling for another statewide referendum, were introduced in the legislature in 2015 and 2016, but none made it out of committee. A 2016 federal lawsuit alleging that the flag is tantamount to "state-sanctioned hate speech" was dismissed by both a district court and the 5th Circuit Court of Appeals. The US Supreme Court declined to hear the case.

Hospitality and Bicentennial flags

An alternative was devised in 2014 by artist Laurin Stennis, granddaughter of former U.S. senator John C. Stennis. Her proposal was originally dubbed the "Declare Mississippi flag" but was popularly called the "Stennis flag" and later renamed the "Hospitality flag". In June 2020, Stennis stepped back from the effort to change the 1894 flag, citing potential harm associated with her last name, which she shares with her grandfather who was a segregationist for much of his career. In August 2020, the copyrighted design was withdrawn from being an option for a new flag because it did not include the legislature-mandated "In God We Trust" slogan.

The flag consists of a single blue star on a white field, an inversion of the white star on a blue field of the Bonnie Blue flag. It is encircled by 19 smaller stars representing each state in the Union when Mississippi joined, as well as symbolizing "unity and continuity" drawing inspiration from the artifacts of the indigenous peoples of the region. The central white field represents "faith and possibility", and is flanked on each side by vertical red bars, representing "the blood spilled by Mississippians, whether civilian or military, who have honorably given their lives in pursuit of liberty and justice for all". In an interview, Stennis said the red bars also stand for "Mississippians' 'passionate differences' on the flag issue".

Since its inception, numerous bills were brought before the legislature to have the Stennis flag declared the new state flag, but none of them passed. On April 17, 2019, Mississippi governor Phil Bryant signed a new specialty license plates bill. One of the new specialty plates included the Stennis flag along with the phrase "History + Hope + Hospitality". This was the first time that the Stennis flag's design received some form of state sanction by being used in an official capacity.

A flag was created by the Mississippi Economic Council to celebrate the state's bicentennial in 2017. This flag consisted of a blue, white and red tricolor with the state seal centered on the white stripe. The flag also had the words "Established 1817" and "Bicentennial 2017" written on the white stripe on either side of the seal. This flag, without the wording, has been used as an alternative state flag and has been suggested as a possible replacement for it.

In late June 2020, former Governor Phil Bryant suggested using the bicentennial flag as a future state flag. Following the retirement of the previous state flag on June 30, 2020, this banner was used in some instances as a de facto placeholder. African American Mississippians from 2017 to 2020 frequently used the bicentennial flag along with the 2001 proposed flag.

Third flag (2020–present)

On June 9, 2020, lawmakers gathered votes and started drafting legislation to change the state flag. This was the first substantial action to change the state flag since the 2001 referendum. The proposed legislation would adopt Laurin Stennis's design as the new flag of Mississippi. With the support of Republican Speaker of the House, Philip Gunn, lawmakers began to court Republican state house members to vote for the resolution.

Gunn ensured that he would get the resolution passed through a House committee if verbal support from 30 Republicans was secured to go along with the 45 Democratic members of the House. An update on June 10 showed that lawmakers believed that they had secured at least 20 Republicans who were in favor of voting for the resolution to change the flag, while 20 more were on the fence. The lawmakers' goal was to secure at least 40 Republicans needed to suspend rules to allow a bill to be considered in the session. On June 11, Senate Democrats filed a resolution to change the state flag.

Public pressure for a new flag
On September 10, 2015, Steve Earle released the single "Mississippi It's Time" with all proceeds going towards the civil rights organization, Southern Poverty Law Center. The song was produced by Earle and recorded with his longtime backup band, the Dukes, in the summer of 2015 in the aftermath of the massacre at the Emanuel African Methodist Episcopal Church in June 2015. The song advocates for removal of the Confederate flag from state grounds and tackles historical themes of slavery, racism, patriotism, and progress since the Civil War.

On June 18, 2020, the commissioner of the Southeastern Conference, Greg Sankey, announced the SEC would consider banning championship events in Mississippi until the flag was changed. The SEC is the athletic conference for the two largest universities in Mississippi, Ole Miss and Mississippi State. The announcement by the conference was followed by support of changing the flag from Chancellor Glenn Boyce of The University of Mississippi (Ole Miss) and President Mark E. Keenum of Mississippi State University. The athletic directors of the universities, Keith Carter (Ole Miss) and John Cohen (Mississippi State), also supported changing the flag, along with various coaches from the universities.On June 19, the National Collegiate Athletic Association (NCAA) banned all post-season play from occurring in Mississippi until the flag was changed. The NCAA had previously banned predetermined events such as football bowl games and men's basketball tournament games in 2001 from occurring in the state. The new rule would have also banned merit-based championship sites, such as baseball regionals, softball regionals, women's basketball tournament games and tennis tournament games. Ole Miss hosted both baseball and softball regionals in 2019. Mississippi State hosted a baseball regional, men's tennis tournament games and women's basketball tournament games in 2019.

Also on June 19, the leaders of the eight public universities in Mississippi (Alcorn State University, Delta State University, Jackson State University, Mississippi State University, Mississippi University for Women, Mississippi Valley State University, University of Mississippi and University of Southern Mississippi) issued a joint statement calling for a new state flag. On June 22, Conference USA banned all postseason play in Mississippi until the removal of the Confederate emblem from the state flag. Conference USA is home to the state's third largest university, Southern Miss, and has hosted its annual baseball tournament in Mississippi for eight of the past nine years. On June 23, presidents of the fifteen community colleges in Mississippi issued a joint statement showing their support for a new flag.

The Mississippi Baptist Convention condemned the former state flag on June 23, 2020. In a statement, Baptist leaders said: "The racial overtones of the flag's appearance make this discussion a moral issue. Since the principal teachings of Scripture are opposed to racism, a stand against such is a matter of biblical morality." Walmart announced that it would cease displaying the state flag at its 85 Mississippi store locations on June 23, 2020. The retailer normally displays the applicable state flag alongside the U.S. national flag at its locations in the U.S.

Legislative action
On June 24, 2020, Lieutenant Governor Delbert Hosemann announced his support for a new flag. Hosemann was joined by Attorney General Lynn Fitch, State Auditor Shad White, Agriculture Commissioner Andy Gipson and Insurance Commissioner Mike Chaney. On June 27, 2020, the Mississippi Legislature passed a resolution, House Concurrent Resolution 79, that suspended rules in the legislative chambers in order to debate and vote on a bill to remove and replace the state flag. The motion  passed  the House on an 85–34 vote and the Senate on a 36–14 vote.

At that time, there was no consensus on the method of changing the flag, whether it be retiring the current flag or immediately adopting another. A proposal floated by several members of the Legislature was to create a new Mississippi flag. This flag, with a yet-to-be-determined design that did not include any Confederate images, would be used alongside the current flag. This plan was soundly rejected by Governor Tate Reeves who said it would not "satisfy either side of this debate" and compared it to the separate but equal doctrine.

On June 28, 2020, the Legislature passed a bill, House Bill 1796, that would relinquish the state flag, remove the state flag from public buildings within 15 days of the bill's effective date, and constitute a nine-member commission to design a new flag that would be put to voters in a referendum to be held in November 2020. The bill required that the Confederate battle flag not be included on the proposed design, and the motto "In God We Trust" be included, as Georgia did when it removed the Confederate emblem from its state flag in 2003. In the House, the bill was passed by 91 in favor and 23 against. In the Senate, the bill was passed with 37 in favor and 14 against.

Earlier that weekend, Governor Reeves had stated that he would sign any flag bill passed that weekend by the Legislature into law. Subsequently, after the Legislature passed the bill, a spokesperson for the governor indicated that he would sign, and Reeves did so on June 30, 2020. As the legislation repealed the sections of the Mississippi State Code which made provisions for a state flag, namely Section 3-3-16, Mississippi ceased once again to have an official state flag at this point.

2020 referendum

Under the terms of House Bill 1796 
(approved by Governor on June 30, 2020), a body known as the Commission to Redesign the Mississippi State Flag would be constituted to suggest a design for a new state flag no later than September 14, 2020. The bill instructed the Mississippi Department of Archives and History to develop a plan for the removal of the 1894 flag from public buildings across the state and provide administrative support for the commission. The act stipulated that any design proposed by the commission must include the words "In God We Trust" and must not contain the Confederate battle flag. The proposed design would then be subject to a referendum to be held concurrently with the general election on November 3, 2020.

The Mississippi Department of Archives and History invited the public to submit designs for a new state flag on July 13. In accordance with the rules imposed by House Bill 1796, designs would only be accepted if they contained the words "In God We Trust" and not include the Confederate battle flag. The commission also added that suggestions would need to be unique and adhere to principles of the North American Vexillological Association: that the design should use only two or three basic colors, be simple enough for a child to draw, and have meaningful symbolism.

More than 2000 submissions meeting the legislative criteria were received and displayed on the Mississippi Department of Archives and History website. Each of the 9 commission members picked 25 flags, narrowing the list down to 147. While a modified Hospitality flag did not proceed beyond the first round, a similar-looking "Mosquito flag" briefly did, apparently due to a commissioner's typographical error. At an August 14 meeting, the commission announced that they had selected nine finalists. These finalists, depicting various elements including a representation of the Mississippi River, magnolias, and stars composed of diamonds significant to the Choctaw nation, had either red, white, and blue or green and white color schemes. The commission announced that they would narrow these designs down to five finalists at its next meeting on August 18. Five finalists were published on August 18, and this was reduced to two flags on August 25.

The final two flags were the "Great River Flag" designed by Micah Whitson and "The New Magnolia" designed by Rocky Vaughan, Sue Anna Joe, Kara Giles and Dominique Pugh. On September 2, the commission voted 8–1 to put the New Magnolia flag on the November ballot. Slight modifications were made to the original design, including making the text bolder and the red and gold bars thicker. The flag is officially referred to as the "In God We Trust Flag". Rocky Vaughan is credited with designing the flag's overall layout, with design support provided by Sue Anna Joe, Kara Giles and Dominique Pugh (who created the magnolia illustration featured in the center). Micah Whitson was also given credit for the appearance of the Native American star. The flag was approved by 73% of the votes cast in a referendum on November 3, 2020. The flag was passed by the Mississippi State House of Representatives on January 5, 2021, and was passed by the State Senate on January 6, 2021. It officially became the state flag after being signed by the state's Governor on January 11, 2021.

According to the Mississippi Department of Archives and History,

After the 2020 referendum
Let Mississippi Vote is a group that is attempting another referendum on a choice of four flag designs: the Magnolia flag that was adopted in the November 2020 referendum, the flag that it replaced, the Stennis version, and the Bicentennial flag. Their stated aim is to give Mississippians a choice instead of voting on only one flag.  The group reached their goal of 5000 volunteers and has sent wording for their referendum to the Mississippi Attorney General's Office for approval. They need 106,190 valid signatures from Mississippi residents for the initiative to be placed on a ballot no earlier than 2023.

The number of valid signatures was specified by a 1992 amendment to the Mississippi Constitution when the state had five congressional districts, and written as 12% of the total votes cast for governor in the election preceding the filing of the ballot initiative, with no more than 20% of those signatures coming from a single congressional district. However, as a result of redistricting after the 2000 U.S. Census, Mississippi was reduced to four congressional districts.  In an unrelated case involving a medical marijuana initiative that had been certified for the ballot and then approved by Mississippi voters in 2020, the Mississippi Supreme Court overturned the initiative and said that the ballot requirements "cannot work in a world where Mississippi has fewer than five representatives in Congress".  Although Let Mississippi Vote continues to collect signatures, the court decision has so far not yet been addressed by the legislature, for example by further amending the Mississippi Constitution.

See also

 List of flags by design
 List of Mississippi state symbols
 List of U.S. state, district, and territorial insignia

Notes

References

Further reading

External links

View the Commission to Redesign the Mississippi State Flag meetings
House Bill 1796

The Flag and the Fury – Audio history
Mississippi Flag & Fashion

 
1894 establishments in Mississippi
2020 disestablishments in Mississippi
2021 establishments in Mississippi
African-American-related controversies
Mississippi
Mississippi
Political controversies in the United States
Race-related controversies in the United States
Flag
Mississippi
Mississippi
Mississippi